Willem Outgertsz. Akersloot (1600–1661) was a Dutch Golden Age engraver.

Biography
Akersloot was born in Haarlem.  According to the RKD he signed his works with the monogram A in a double square, or with "Akersloot F". He was a pupil of Jan van de Velde and is known for his landscape illustrations engraved after other artists such as Pieter de Molijn, Pieter Saenredam and Adriaen van de Venne. He also worked in Paris in 1620. He was possibly also the pupil of Jacob van der Schuere, whose portrait he engraved. He was the son of Outgert Ariss Akersloot, who signed Salomon de Bray's petition to the city council in 1631 for a new reorganization of the Haarlem Guild of St. Luke.  He died in The Hague.

References

Willem Outgertsz. Akersloot on Artnet

1600 births
1661 deaths
Dutch Golden Age printmakers
Artists from Haarlem